The 2013 season was Stabæk's 1st season back in the Adeccoligaen following their relegation in from the Tippeligaen in 2012. It was their second season with Petter Belsvik as their manager, in which they finished second in the league, earning promotion back to the Tippeligaen, and reached the Fourth Round of the Cup.

Squad

Transfers

Winter

In:

 

Out:

Summer

In:

 

Out:

Competitions

Adeccoligaen

Results

Table

Norwegian Cup

Squad statistics

Appearances and goals

|-
|colspan="14"|Players away from Stabæk on loan:
|-
|colspan="14"|Players who appeared for Stabæk no longer at the club:
|}

Goal scorers

Disciplinary record

References

Stabæk Fotball seasons
Stabaek